Kingsley Nkemjika Abasili  (born June 30, 1984) is a Nigerian actor. He is known for his striking resemblance to veteran actor Pete Edochie. Both actors are from Anambra State but they are not related.

Biography

Abasili is from Igbo-Ukwu, a town in Aguata local government area of Anambra State in the Southeastern region of Nigeria. He was born in Makurdi, Benue State, Nigeria.

Education 
He has a bachelor's degree in Public Administration, from Ebonyi State University, Abakaliki. On March 25, 2017, he convocated alongside other postgraduate students in the department of Political and Administrative Studies - International Relations (master's degree), faculty of Social Sciences, University of Port Harcourt, Rivers State.

Career 
In 2019, Abasili attracted media attention for his resemblance to the veteran actor Pete Edochie. Abasili looks like the younger version of Edochie and has been called his doppelganger.

Subsequently, Abasili joined the Nigeria film industry in the same year and has since featured alongside Nollywood actors such as Gentle Jack and Emmanuel Ehumadu, known as Labistar. In 2019, he featured in Try Me as School Principal in Mark Angel's short comedy skit alongside Dominion Uche and others.

Filmography

Recognition

Abasili was invited to the Akaraka event as a guest and was honored with a recognition award by Anambra Through a Lens in 2020 alongside other recipients, including Chief Press Secretary to Anambra state Governor and Sir James Eze. Honourable Commissioner for Youth and Digital Economy, Hon. Afam Mbanefo presented the award to the recipients.

Publications
Glocalization and the Politics of Poverty Alleviation in Nigeria's Covid-19 Era

References

External links 

Living people
University of Port Harcourt alumni
Igbo male actors
21st-century Nigerian male actors
Male actors from Anambra State
1984 births
Nigerian male film actors
Nigerian male television actors